John Tory (born 1954) is the mayor of Toronto, serving since 2014.

John Tory may also refer to:

 John A. Tory (1930–2011), Canadian lawyer, corporate executive and father of the mayor
 John S. D. Tory (1903–1965), Canadian lawyer and grandfather of the mayor

See also
 John Torrey (1796–1873), American scientist
 John Torry (1800–1879), Scottish Episcopalian priest
 John Troy (disambiguation)